The reticulated toad-headed agama  (Phrynocephalus reticulatus) is a species of agamid lizard found in Central Asia and West Asia.

Distribution
N Afghanistan, S Kazakhstan, W Uzbekistan, Turkmenistan and N Pakistan (Kashmir).
Type locality: Valley of the River Amudarya and East Coast of the Caspian Sea

References

 Ananjeva, Natalia B.;Tuniyev, Boris S. 1992 Historical biogeography of the Phrynocephalus species of the USSR Asiatic Herpetological Research 4: 76-98
 Barts, M. & Wilms, T. 2003 Die Agamen der Welt. Draco 4 (14): 4-23
 Eichwald, E. 1831 Zoologia specialis, quam expositis animalibus tum vivis, tum fossilibus potissimuni rossiae in universum, et poloniae in specie, in usum lectionum publicarum in Universitate Caesarea Vilnensi. Zawadski, Vilnae.

External links
 

reticulatus
Reptiles of Pakistan
Reptiles of Afghanistan
Reptiles of Central Asia
Reptiles described in 1831
Taxa named by Karl Eichwald